Red Wine is a 1928 American comedy film directed by Raymond Cannon and written by Andrew Bennison, Charles R. Condon and Garrett Graham. The film stars June Collyer, Conrad Nagel, Arthur Stone, Sharon Lynn, E. Alyn Warren and Ernest Hilliard. The film was released on December 23, 1928, by Fox Film Corporation.

Cast      
June Collyer as Alice Cook
Conrad Nagel as Charles H. Cook
Arthur Stone as Jack Brown
Sharon Lynn as Miss Scott
E. Alyn Warren as Jack's first friend
Ernest Hilliard as Jack's second friend
Ernest Wood as Jack's third friend
Marshall Ruth as Jack's fourth friend
Dixie Gay as Stenographer
Margaret La Marr as Spanish cigarette girl
Bo Ling as Chinese dancer
Dolores Johnson as Mrs. Brown
Mike Tellegen as Head waiter 
Betty Lorraine as Slinky
Lialani Deas as Hawaiian dancer

References

External links
 

1928 films
1920s English-language films
Silent American comedy films
1928 comedy films
Fox Film films
American black-and-white films
American silent feature films
FIlms directed by Raymond Cannon (actor)
1920s American films